Wyszki  is a village in Bielsk County, Podlaskie Voivodeship, in north-eastern Poland. It is the seat of the gmina (administrative district) called Gmina Wyszki.

References

Wyszki
Grodno Governorate
Białystok Voivodeship (1919–1939)
Belastok Region